Jeremy Slater is an American writer and producer of film and television, known for his work on films such as Fantastic Four and Death Note, and on television series such as The Umbrella Academy and The Exorcist, which Slater created, and on which he served as executive producer. He is the head writer and executive producer for the Disney+ miniseries Moon Knight.

Career
Slater wrote My Spy, an action comedy film which will be directed by Jake Kasdan, as well as Tape 4, a horror film to be produced by Primal Pictures, and Man of Tomorrow, a superhero noir film which was included in the 2012 Black List.

In July 2012, Slater was hired to write the script for the 2015 Fantastic Four film. After the film was released in August 2015, Slater commented that a lot of what he wrote was not in the finished film (particularly his version of the first act), but that he'll "always be honored that [he] got to play in such a cool sandbox."

Slater's original version of the script for Fantastic Four was said to feel more in tone to a Marvel Studios movie, being an action-packed superhero adventure in contrast to the final film's dark and realistic tone. It included the villains Galactus, who is the source for the titular characters' powers, Mole Man, and Doctor Doom as a Latverian dictator and herald to Galactus, in contrast to the antisocial programmer he was portrayed as in the finished film.

Slater wrote a draft of the live action American film adaptation of Takeshi Obata's manga series Death Note (2017), which was directed by Adam Wingard. The finished version of the film deviated from and omitted several significant elements of his original screenplay draft and at best, featured minute elements from his original script draft.

Slater is the creator and executive producer of The Exorcist, a TV drama based on the film with the same name.

In November 2019, Slater was hired as the head writer and executive producer for the Disney+ series Moon Knight by Marvel Studios.

He will co-write the upcoming Warner Bros. Pictures film Coyote vs. Acme with James Gunn, Jon Silberman, Josh Silberman and Samy Burch.

In January 2022, Slater was hired to write a sequel to Mortal Kombat. In August 2022, Collider reported that Slater had co-written the Untitled Godzilla vs. Kong sequel with Terry Rossio and Simon Barrett.

In January 2023, it was revealed Slater had joined a writers' room assembled by James Gunn to map out the overarching story of the DC Universe.

Filmography
Film

Executive producer
 Stephanie (2017)

Television

References

External links 
 
 

Living people
Year of birth missing (living people)
Place of birth missing (living people)
American male screenwriters
American television writers
American male television writers